Hypnotize Me may refer to:
 Hypnotize Me (Wang Chung song)
 Hypnotize Me (Olu Maintain song)